Clitocybe nuda, commonly known as the wood blewit and alternately described as Lepista nuda, is an edible mushroom native to Europe and North America. Described by Pierre Bulliard in 1790, it was also known as Tricholoma nudum for many years. It is found in both coniferous and deciduous woodlands. It is a fairly distinctive mushroom that is widely eaten, though there is some caution about edibility. Nevertheless, it has been cultivated in Britain, the Netherlands and France.

Taxonomy and naming
The French mycologist Pierre Bulliard described the wood blewit in his work Herbier de la France in 1790 as Agaricus nudus, reporting that it was common in the woods all year. He wrote of two varieties: one whose gills and cap are initially light violet and mature to burgundy, while the other has vine-coloured gills that intensify in colour with age. He added that the first variety was often confused with Cortinarius violaceus, though it has a "nude" cap and no spidery web veil unlike the other species.  English naturalist James Bolton gave it the name Agaricus bulbosa—the bulbous agaric—in his An History of Fungusses growing about Halifax in 1791. He noted that it was rare in the region, though had found some in Ovenden.

German mycologist Paul Kummer placed it in the genus Tricholoma in 1871, the same year that English botanist Mordecai Cubitt Cooke placed it in Lepista. It was known by these names for many years, with some authors accepting Lepista and while others retained the wood blewit in Tricholoma. In 1969 Howard E. Bigelow and Alexander H. Smith reviewed Lepista and reclassified it as a subgenus of Clitocybe Finnish mycologist Harri Harmaja has called for the sinking of Lepista into Clitocybe, with C. nebularis as the type species of the latter genus. Hence the wood blewit is classified as either Lepista nuda or Clitocybe nuda.

A 2015 genetic study found that the genera Collybia and Lepista were closely related to the core clade of Clitocybe, but that all three were polyphyletic, with many members in lineages removed from other members of the same genus and instead more closely related to the other two. To complicate matters, the wood blewit is not closely related to the type species of Lepista, L. densifolia. Alvarado and colleagues declined to define the genera but proposed several options and highlighted the need for a wider analysis.

The species is commonly known as the wood blewit. Cooke called it the amethyst lepista, John Sibthorp called it the blue-gilled agaric in his 1794 work Flora Oxoniensis.

Description
This mushroom can range from lilac to purple-pink. Some North American specimens are duller and tend toward tan, but usually have purplish tones on the stem and gills. Wood blewits have a very distinctive odor, which has been likened by one author to that of frozen orange juice.

Wood blewits can be easily distinguished by their odor, as well as by their spore print, which is white to pale pink.

Similar species 
Wood blewits can be confused with certain blue or purple species of the genus Cortinarius, including the uncommon C. camphoratus, many of which may be poisonous. Cortinarius mushrooms often have the remains of a veil under their caps and a ring-like impression on their stem. Cortinarius species produce a rusty brown spore print after several hours on white paper. Their brown spores often dust their stems and objects beneath them.

The species also resembles Clitocybe brunneocephala, Clitocybe tarda, Laccaria amethysteo-occidentalis, and Lepista subconnexa.

Distribution and habitat 
The wood blewit is found in Europe and North America and is becoming more common in Australia, where it appears to have been introduced. In Australia it has developed a relationship with some eucalyptus species and gorse; with an entirely different growth pattern and differs slightly in appearance to its European Lepista nuda cousins. It is commonly referred to as "the purple nudist mushroom", a name coined by Australian Free Food Forager Ingrid Button in 2016.

It is a saprotrophic species, growing on decaying leaf litter. In the United Kingdom, it appears from September through to December.

Soil analysis of soil containing mycelium from a wood blewit fairy ring under Norway spruce (Picea abies) and Scots pine (Pinus sylvestris) in southeast Sweden yielded fourteen halogenated low molecular weight organic compounds, three of which were brominated and the others chlorinated. It is unclear whether these were metabolites or pollutants. Brominated compounds are unknown as metabolites from terrestrial fungi.

The form glaucocana is found in mountainous environs.

Ecology
In Australia, male satin bowerbirds collect blue objects to decorate their bowers with. A young male was reported to have collected wood blewits to this end near Braidwood in southern New South Wales.

Edibility
Wood blewits are generally regarded as a good edible, but they are known to cause allergic reactions in sensitive individuals. This is particularly likely if the mushroom is consumed raw, though allergic reactions are known even from cooked blewits. It is therefore important to cook wood blewits before eating, as consumption of raw specimens could lead to indigestion. Wood blewits contain the sugar trehalose, which is edible for most people.

Blewits can be eaten as a cream sauce or sautéed in butter. They can also be cooked like tripe or as omelette filling, and also make good stewing mushrooms. They have a strong flavour, so they combine well with leeks or onions.

Wood blewits can be dried, or can be preserved in olive oil or white vinegar after blanching.

The wood blewit  has been cultivated in Britain, the Netherlands and France. Cultivated wood blewits are said not to taste as good as wild wood blewits.

Gallery

References

External links

 Harmaja, H. (2003). Notes on Clitocybe s. lato (Agaricales). Ann. Bot. Fennici 40: 213-218.
 Denise Gregory's key to Clitocybe in California
 "Mushroom-Collecting.com - The Blewit"
 "Clitocybe nuda / Lepista nuda: The Blewit" by Michael Kuo
 Clitocybe nuda - Tom Volk's Fungus of the Month for November 1998
 All that Rain Promises and More - Blewit
 La Cave des Roches - caves in France where cultivated Clitocybe nuda are grown.

nuda
Edible fungi
Fungi described in 1790
Fungi of Europe
Fungi of North America
Fungi in cultivation
Taxa named by Jean Baptiste François Pierre Bulliard